The Hungary women's national volleyball team is the national volleyball team of Hungary. It is governed by the Magyar Röplabda Szövetség and takes part in international volleyball competitions.

Results

Olympic Games
 1972 — 5th place
 1976 — 4th place
 1980 — 4th place

World Championship
 1952 — 6th place
 1962 — 11th place
 1970 — 4th place
 1974 — 6th place
 1978 — 13th place
 1982 — 10th place

World Grand Prix
 2017 — 25th

European Championship
1949 —  6th place
1950 —  6th place
1955 —  6th place
1958 —  6th place
1963 —  7th place
1967 —  5th place
1971 —  5th place
1975 — 
1977 — 
1979 —  4th place
1981 — 
1983 — 
1985 —  9th place
1987 — 10th place
2015 — 12th place
2017 — 15th place
2019 — 20th place
2021 — 16th place
2023 — qualified

European Volleyball League
 2011 — 9th place
 2012 — 12th place
 2013 — 7th place
 2015 —  Gold Medal
 2016 — 10th place
 2018 —  Silver Medal
 2019 — 5th place
 2021 — 9th place
 2022 — 7th place

Current squad
Head coach: Jan de Brandt (2014-2015)

References

External links

CEV profile
FIVB profile

National women's volleyball teams
Volleyball in Hungary
Volleyball